European was a brand of Formula One engines. European sponsored Minardi in the 2001 season and acted as the engine supplier to the team. The engines were Ford-built engines, branded as European.

History

European Aviation was a regular sponsor across Formula One and Formula 3000 during the late 1990s and early 2000s, initially with the Tyrrell team, and later with Jordan Grand Prix and Arrows Grand Prix.

In 2001, European Aviation owner Paul Stoddart acquired the Minardi team. It became known as European Minardi, and ran with European branding on the cars alongside the engines being branded as "European".

Complete Formula One results
(key) (results in bold indicate pole position)

References

Formula One engine manufacturers